Paolo Mereghetti (born 28 September 1949) is an Italian film critic.

Born in Milan, Mereghetti graduated in philosophy with a thesis about Orson Welles. Currently the film critic of the  newspaper Corriere della Sera, he collaborated with various magazines, including  Positif, Linus, SegnoCinema, Ombre Rosse. 

Mereghetti is best known for the book collection of film reviews Il Mereghetti, he published in various editions starting from 1993. In 2001 he was awarded a Flaiano Prize for film criticism.

References

External links

 

1949 births
Living people
Writers from Milan
Italian film critics